Yadla Gopalarao (born 4 May 1950) is an Indian theatre artist. He was conferred with Padma Shri, India's fourth-highest civilian award, in arts in 2020. He performed in about 5,600 plays.

Early life 
Yadla Gopalarao was born on 4 May 1950 to Yadla Rammorthi and Lakshmamma in Mandarada village of Srikakulam district, Andhra Pradesh. He was schooled in Mandarada and completed pre-university course in Government College, Srikakulam.

Career 
Gopalarao debuted in theatre in 1964 with the social-play Desamkosam. He later performed in Pavala, "Aagandi, Konchem Aalochinchandi", Pularangadu, Chillarakottu Chittemma, Palle Paduchu, President Pattayya, Narada Garvabhangam, Kurukshetram, Gayopakhyanam, Satya Harishchandra among others. His most notable work is the role "Nakshtraka" that he played in Satya Harishchandra which he played in about 3,600 performances. In total, he performed in about 5,600 plays.

Awards 
The Government of India has conferred Rao with Padma Shri award, India's fourth-highest civilian award, in arts for the year 2020.

References 

Living people
1950 births
People from Srikakulam district
20th-century Indian male artists
Artists from Andhra Pradesh
Male actors in Telugu theatre
Recipients of the Padma Shri in arts